Cunorana (possibly from Aymara for a variety of potato of the qhini group,) is a mountain in the Vilcanota mountain range in the Andes of Peru, about  high. It is situated in the Puno Region, Carabaya Province, Corani District. Cunorana lies southeast of Millo in the northeastern part of the large glaciated area of Quelccaya (Quechua for "snow plain").

References

Mountains of Puno Region
Mountains of Peru